Huscher is an unincorporated community in Cloud County, Kansas, United States.

History

In 1887, Atchison, Topeka and Santa Fe Railway built a branch line from Neva (3 miles west of Strong City) through Huscher to Superior, Nebraska.  Huscher became a shipping point of some importance. In 1996, the Atchison, Topeka and Santa Fe Railway merged with Burlington Northern Railroad and renamed to the current BNSF Railway.  Most locals still refer to this railroad as the "Santa Fe".

Huscher had a post office from 1892 until it closed 1914. It was re-established in 1915, and finally closed again in 1934.

Education
The community is served by Concordia USD 333 public school district.

References

Further reading

External links
 Cloud County maps: Current, Historic, KDOT

Unincorporated communities in Cloud County, Kansas
Unincorporated communities in Kansas